Vocal Few are an American folk pop husband and wife duo, consisting of Matt and Kristie MacDonald, from Seattle, Washington. Vocal Few, a side project to Matt MacDonald's band, The Classic Crime, began as a 'pre-baby bucket list' item for the couple before the birth of their first daughter, Praise MacDonald. Their first EP, She'll Be Right, was released in January 2012, one month after Praise was born. Their second EP, Tall Trees, was released in May 2013 shortly after finding out they were pregnant with their second daughter, Piper MacDonald. Their love for making music together expanded beyond the inspiration of their offspring – their third EP, titled The Dream Alive was released on October 30, 2015 with no new babies on the way. Their most recent release is a collection of original winter songs aptly named 'The Snowdrift EP', which was released on November 30, 2016.

Background
Matt and Kristie met at summer camp when they were 15 and 16 years old. They began dating at 17 and 18 and eventually married at 21 and 22. Matt began playing music with The Classic Crime in 2003, and Matt and Kristie would eventually form Vocal Few in 2011 when Kristie became pregnant with their first child.

Music history
Matt and Kristie formed Vocal Few in 2011, shortly after Matt's band, The Classic Crime, became independent. Their first EP, She'll Be Right, was released on January 10, 2012 independently. It landed on the Billboard magazine charts, where it placed at No. 8 on the Folk Albums chart and at No. 12 on the Heatseekers Albums chart. Their second EP, Tall Trees, was released on May 21, 2013. Their third EP, The Dream Alive, was released on October 30, 2015. Their most recent release, "Snowdrift EP", is a collection of original winter songs and was released on November 30, 2016.

Members
 Kristie MacDonald
 Matt MacDonald

Discography

References

External links
 Official website

American musical duos
Musical groups established in 2011
Musical groups from Seattle
2011 establishments in Washington (state)